Taj Mahal is a Pakistani Urdu language film released on 22 December 1968. It is directed by S.T. Zaidi and was his first film in the country. Previously, he served as the assistant director of K. Asif's Mughal-e-Azam (1960). The film stars Mohammed Ali, Zeba, Habib, Yousuf Khan and Aliya. The music of the film was composed by Nisar Bazmi. A Box office hit, the film was released in December 1968.

Plot summary
The film is based on the romance of the historical legend of the Mughal emperor Shah Jahan, who built Taj Mahal in the love and remambrance of his beloved wife Mumtaz Mahal.

Cast
 Muhammad Ali
 Zeba
 Habib
 Yousuf Khan
 Aliya
 Talish
 Munawwar Zarif

This film was directed by S.T. Zaidi and the music composer was Nisar Bazmi.

Soundtrack

Awards and recognition
 Nigar Awards in 1968 for 'Best cinematographer' and 'Best art director'.

References

External links
 

1960s Urdu-language films
Urdu-language Pakistani films
Pakistani historical drama films
Pakistani black-and-white films